Bassey Edet Otu (born 18 October 1959) is a Nigerian politician who represented the Calabar Municipal/Odukpani constituency of Cross River State, Nigeria in the Federal House of Representatives from 2003 - 2011.
He was elected Senator for Cross River South in the April 2011 elections, running on the People's Democratic Party (PDP) platform.  He later defected in 2016 to the All Progressives Congress (APC) and emerged the Cross River South Senatorial flag bearer of the party in the 2019 election. Prince otu is the current Governor Elect of Cross River state after the 2023 Gubernatorial polls

Background

Prince Bassey Edet Otu was born on 18 October 1959 to the family of Late Eld. & Mrs. Edet Okon Otu of Adiabo in Odukpani Local Government Area of Cross River State. He grew up in his home city of Calabar and in Jos, Plateau State, where his father had been assigned to the mission of the Church of Scotland. 
He obtained a bachelor's degree in the Faculty of Social Sciences from the University of Calabar. Before entering politics, he was engaged in banking and then in the petroleum sector. He also dabbles in farming.

House of Representatives (2003-2011)

Otu was elected a Member of House of Representatives in April 2003 to represent Calabar Municipality/Odukpani Federal Constituency and reelected in April 2007. 
Within this period (2003-2011), he was Chairman, House Committee on Petroleum (Upstream), Vice Chairman, House Committee on National Population and member of committees on Power, Ministry of Niger Delta, Inter-Parliamentary Relations, Inter-Intra Party Relations, Environment, Water Resources and Defense.
In a 2007 interview, he said the ruling by an international court that the Bakassi peninsula belonged to Cameroon was wrong, but that the job now was to resettle displaced relatives of Nigerians and move on.
Otu was Chairman of the House of Representatives Committee on Petroleum Resources (Upstream).
In this role, he led work on a draft amendment bill that would reposition the Petroleum Technology Development Fund as a more effective vehicle to develop local content in the oil and gas industry.

The Senator, also for effective delivery sponsored the Nigerian Content Development Act, which today has revolutionized the petroleum sector and has put food on the table of many Nigerians.

Senator
In 2011, Otu was elected as Senator representing Cross River Southern Senatorial District. On arrival in the Senate, he became the Chairman, Senate Committee on Finance and later Chairman, Senate Committee on Banking and other financial Institutions; he was also a member, Committee on Navy, Power, Petroleum and Water Resources. His impact at the Senate was adjudged by many to be till date unprecedented; his name is said to be synonymous with human empowerment and societal development, this led to his being endorsed for re-election by Buhari Youth Organisation.

In 2018, Otu was appointed into the board of National Health Insurance Scheme (NHIS) by President Muhammadu Buhari.

He is a receiver of several awards, both nationally and internationally.

In his words, “I joined politics for service to humanity”. This is evidently true, as his record of empowerment ranging from Award of land documents and financial support to build, car awards, scholarships etc. is yet to be broken.

He is happily married to Mrs. Eyoanwan Bassey Otu and the marriage is blessed with children.

Gallery

References

Living people
1959 births
Members of the House of Representatives (Nigeria)
Peoples Democratic Party members of the Senate (Nigeria)